In the run-up to the 2023 Dutch provincial elections, various organisations are carrying out opinion polling to gauge voting intentions in the Netherlands.  In addition to national pollsters such as I&O Research and Ipsos, some local and smaller polling organizations have polled for voting intentions in specific provinces or even cities. The first opinion polls for these elections were conducted in January 2023, with final polls often being released close to the election. The elections were held on the 15th of March 2023.

National

Vote Share

Drenthe

Seats
Due to an increase of population to more than 500.000 in September 2022, the amount of seats in the Provincial Council of Drenthe is set to be expanded from 41 to 43.

Vote Share

Flevoland

Seats

Vote Share

Friesland

Seats

Vote Share

Gelderland

Seats

Vote Share

Groningen

Seats

Vote Share

Limburg

Seats

Vote Share

North Brabant

Seats

Vote Share

North Holland

Seats

Vote Share

Amsterdam

Overijssel

Seats

Vote Share

South Holland

Seats

Vote Share

Utrecht

Seats

Vote Share

Zeeland

Seats

Vote Share

Notes

References

Opinion polling in the Netherlands